Urumu Dhanalakshmi College, is a general degree college located in Tiruchirappalli, Tamil Nadu. It was established in the year 1946. The college is affiliated with Bharathidasan University. This college offers different courses in arts, commerce and science.

Departments

Science

Physics
Chemistry
Mathematics
Computer Science
Microbiology
Botany

Arts and Commerce

Tamil
English
History
Economics
Social Work
Commerce

Accreditation
The college is  recognized by the University Grants Commission (UGC).

References

External links
http://periyarevrcollege.ac.in/

Educational institutions established in 1946
1946 establishments in India
Colleges affiliated to Bharathidasan University
Universities and colleges in Tiruchirappalli